Summerside is a newer neighbourhood in south Edmonton, Alberta, Canada.  It is located south of Ellerslie Road (9 Avenue SW), west of 66 Street, north of 25 Avenue SW, and east of 91 Street SW and Parsons Road.  A portion of the west boundary runs along Parsons Road, until its southern terminus at 91 Street, which then becomes the western boundary.

The community developer of Summerside is Brookfield Residential Properties Inc.

Three out of four residences (76%) are single-family dwellings.  The remainder are split roughly equally between apartments in low-rise buildings with fewer than five stories (12%) and row houses (11%).  The few remaining dwellings are duplexes (1%).

The community is represented by the Summerside Community League.

Some of the most popular activities that Summerside residents enjoy during the warm summer months are paddle boarding, kayaking, canoeing and swimming in the members-only lake.

Demographics 

Surrounding neighbourhoods 
Amongst others, one of the newest surrounding neighbourhoods is Aurora.

See also 
 Edmonton Federation of Community Leagues

References

External links 
 Summerside Neighbourhood Profile

Neighbourhoods in Edmonton